WVM  is a musician, composer and visual artist located in Los Angeles, California. He is a multi-instrumentalist who mainly uses analog equipment.
In May 2017, "Empire" (Originally released in 2014) mixed by Sean Beavan debuted on The CW's TV show "The 100"

History

Formation (2014)

A great number of his early demos under a number of different monikers were licensed to TV shows and video games such as Supergirl, UFC 3, Sony Computer Entertainment's Infamous 2 Official Karma trailer, Syfy's Being Human, CBS's Criminal Minds and Hostages among many other TV shows and video games.

Discography
Empire - Digital Single (2014)
Pale Horse - Digital Single (2014)
Duel - Digital Single (2018)
After the Fall - Digital Single (2018)
CRA - Digital Single (2018)

References

External links
 wvmmusic.com

American electronic musicians
Living people
Year of birth missing (living people)